USS Larch (AN-21/YN-16) was an Aloe-class net laying ship which was assigned to serve the U.S. Navy during World War II with her protective anti-submarine nets.

Built in West Virginia
Larch (YN-16) was laid down 18 October 1940 by Marietta Manufacturing Company, Point Pleasant, West Virginia; launched 2 July 1941; and placed in service 13 December 1941.

World War II service
After shakedown, Larch was assigned to the 3d Naval District and operated on antisubmarine warfare (ASW) patrol out of New York harbor. Departing New York City 12 April 1942, the net tender arrived Trinidad, 2 weeks later for patrol and net laying operations in the West Indies.
 
Larch was placed in full commission at Trinidad 13 December 1942 and was reclassified AN-21 on 20 January 1944. Playing a small but vital role, she laid, maintained, and removed anti-torpedo and antisubmarine nets in the West Indies throughout World War II. On 10 January 1945, Larch helped salvage a Pan American Clipper which had crashed in the Gulf of Paria, Venezuela, recovering six bodies and the plane fuselage.

Post-war decommissioning
Departing Trinidad 25 September, Larch steamed toward Norfolk, Virginia, arriving there 12 October. She operated out of Norfolk until she decommissioned there 28 June 1946. She was struck from the Navy List 5 March 1947, and transferred to Turkey under the Military Assistance Program 10 May 1948. She served the Turkish Navy as AG-4 (P-304).

References 
 
 NavSource Online: Service Ship Photo Archive - YN-16 / AN-21 Larch

 

Aloe-class net laying ships
Ships built in Point Pleasant, West Virginia
1941 ships
World War II net laying ships of the United States
Ships transferred from the United States Navy to the Turkish Navy